C-Lab or C-LAB may refer to:

 C-LAB, is a software, in Portugal, that aim the optimization and automation of administrative processes in accounting offices and companies
 A software product of Emagic, a former company in Rellingen, Germany 
 Taiwan Contemporary Culture Lab, a cultural center in Taipei, Taiwan
 Columbia Laboratory for Architectural Broadcasting, a research lab at Columbia University
 Colorado Education Work Lab, an association at Colorado Department of Higher Education